Dombrovskis (feminine: Dombrovska) is a Latvian surname of Polish origin (from Polish surname Dąbrowski). Notable people with the surname include:

Peter Dombrovskis (1945–1996), Australian photographer
Valdis Dombrovskis (born 1971), Latvian politician
Vjačeslavs Dombrovskis (born 1977), Latvian politician and economist

Latvian-language masculine surnames
Surnames of Polish origin